The European Brain Council (EBC) is a coordinating international health organization founded in 2002. It comprises major organisations in the field of brain research and brain disorders in Europe, and thus its structure involves a network of patients, scientists and doctors, working in partnership with the pharmaceutical and medical devices industries. The EBC works with decision making bodies such as the European Commission, the European Parliament and the World Health Organization.

Membership

Patient organisations 
 European Federation of Neurological Associations
 GAMIAN-Europe (Global Alliance of Mental Illness Advocacy Networks-Europe)

Scientific members 
 European Academy of Neurology
 European Federation of Neurological Societies
 European College of Neuropsychopharmacology
 European Psychiatric Association
 Federation of European Neuroscience Societies
 Pan European Regional Committee of the International Brain Research Organization

References

External links
 Official website

European medical and health organizations
Neurology organizations
Psychiatric research institutes
International organisations based in Belgium
Organizations established in 2002
2002 establishments in Europe